Syncamaris is a monotypic moth genus in the family Copromorphidae. Its only species, Syncamaris argophthalma, is found in Brazil. Both the genus and species were first described by Edward Meyrick in 1932.

References

Copromorphidae
Moths described in 1932
Monotypic moth genera